Phase IV is a 2002 Canadian direct-to-video action-thriller film starring Dean Cain and Brian Bosworth. It was directed by Bryan Goeres.

Plot
Journalist Simon Tate is investigating the apparently "unrelated" accidental deaths of several students at a local university. When his friend, Dr. Benjamin Roanic, becomes a prime suspect and is then subsequently murdered, Simon sets out to prove Roanic's innocence and establish a link between the deaths and an AIDS-related drug test program.

Cast
 Dean Cain as Simon Tate
 Brian Bosworth as Detective Steven Birnam
 Mimi Kuzyk as Diana Holt
 Heather Mathieson as Carla Tate
 Richard Donat as Karl Dean

Reception
Robert Pardi from TV Guide gave the film two out of five stars, stating: "This anti-establishment action flick is an unsatisfying mix of cautionary sci-fi tale and Hitchcockian thriller." Glenn Erickson writing for the website DVD Talk gave the film two and a half out of five stars and said: "Most of the acting is reasonable. Bosworth's role is dull but Dean Cain is likeable in a numbskull kind of way engineered to be acceptable in as many foreign markets as possible."

References

External links
 
 
 

20th Century Fox direct-to-video films
2002 direct-to-video films
2001 action thriller films
Canadian direct-to-video films
Canadian action thriller films
English-language Canadian films
2000s English-language films
2002 films
2000s Canadian films